The following is a list of football stadiums in Peru, ordered by capacity.

See also
List of South American stadiums by capacity
List of association football stadiums by capacity

 
Peru
Football stadiums
Football stadiums